The following railroads operate in the U.S. state of Ohio.

Common freight carriers
Akron Barberton Cluster Railway (AB)
Ann Arbor Railroad (AA), Now owned by Watco Inc
Ashland Railway (ASRY)
Ashtabula, Carson and Jefferson Railroad (ACJR)
Camp Chase Industrial Railroad (CCRA)
Canadian National Railway (CN) through subsidiaries Bessemer and Lake Erie Railroad (BLE) and Grand Trunk Western Railroad (GTW)
Central Railroad of Indiana (CIND)
Chicago, Fort Wayne and Eastern Railroad (CFE)
Operates Delphos Terminal
Cincinnati East Terminal Railway (CET)
Cleveland Commercial Railroad (CCRL)
Cleveland Harbor Belt Railroad (CHB)
Cleveland Works Railway (CWRO)
Columbus and Ohio River Rail Road (CUOH)
CSX Transportation (CSXT) including subsidiary Three Rivers Railway
Flats Industrial Railroad (FIR)
Grand River Railway (GRRY)
Indiana Eastern Railroad (IERR)
Indiana Northeastern Railroad (IN)
Indiana and Ohio Railway (IORY)
Operates South Charleston Railroad, West Central Ohio Port Authority
Kanawha River Railroad (KNWA)
Lake Terminal Railroad (LT)
Lorain Northern Railroad (LNOR)
Mahoning Valley Railway (MVRY)
Napoleon, Defiance & Western Railroad (NDW), Owned by Pioneer Lines
Newburgh and South Shore Railroad (NSR)
Norfolk Southern Railway (NS) including subsidiary Cincinnati, New Orleans and Texas Pacific Railway (CNTP)
Northern Ohio and Western Railway (NOW)
Ohi-Rail Corporation (OHIC)
Ohio Central Railroad (OHCR)
Ohio South Central Railroad (OSCR)
Ohio Southern Railroad (OSRR)
Ohio Terminal Railway (OHIO)
Republic N&T Railroad (NTRY)
R.J. Corman Railroad/Cleveland Line (RJCL)
R.J. Corman Railroad/Western Ohio Lines (RJCW)
RSL Railroad (RSL)
Warren and Trumbull Railroad (WTRM)
Wheeling and Lake Erie Railway (WE)
Youngstown and Austintown Railroad (YARR)
Youngstown Belt Railroad (YB)
Youngstown and Southeastern Railroad (YSRR)
Operates Eastern States Railroad and Ohio and Pennsylvania Railroad (OHPA)

Private freight carriers

Passenger carriers

Defunct railroads

Electric railways
Akron, Bedford and Cleveland Railroad
Akron and Cuyahoga Falls Rapid Transit Company
Blissfield Railroad
Canton and Massillon Electric Railway
Cincinnati, Dayton and Toledo Traction
Cincinnati, Hamilton and Dayton Railway
Cincinnati and Lake Erie Railroad
Cincinnati Street Railway
Cleveland Railway
Cleveland, Southwestern & Columbus Railway
Columbus, Delaware and Marion Railway
Columbus, Marion and Bucyrus Railway
Lake Shore Electric Railway
Muskingum Electric Railroad (private)
Newark and Granville Electric Street Railway
Ohio Electric Railway (OE)
Sandusky, Milan and Norwalk Electric Railway
Shaker Heights Rapid Transit
Toledo and Indiana Railway
Toledo, Port Clinton and Lakeside Railway
Toledo and Western Railway (T&W)
Youngstown and Ohio River Railroad

Notes

References

 Association of American Railroads (2003), . Retrieved May 25, 2005.

 Morris, J. C., compiler (December 31, 1902), Annual report of the Commissioner of Railroads and Telegraphs; Part II, history of the railroads of Ohio.  Retrieved August 16, 2005.

Ohio
 
 
Railroads